Peter G. O'Donoghue (born 1 October 1961) is a former New Zealand and Australian athlete specialising in middle distance running.

Biography
He was selected for the 1982 Commonwealth Games, but withdrew due to injury. At the 1984 Summer Olympics he ran in the 1500m, coming 8th in his semifinal with 3m 38.71s. Notably, in 1984 he beat Steve Ovett on the line in a 1500m race in Melbourne earlier in 1984. He competed for New Zealand in the 1990 Commonwealth Games, winning a bronze in the 1500m with 3m 35.14s. His personal best time was 3:34.9. Subsequently he competed for Australia, but at the 1994 Commonwealth Games withdrew due to injury. Earlier, Peter ran an Australian Resident Record over 5000m of 13:23.6, with the last 800m covered in a world-class 1:56.0.

References 
Athletes at the Games by John Clark, page 94 (1998, Athletics New Zealand)

External links
Profile at NZOGC website

1961 births
Living people
New Zealand male middle-distance runners
Australian male middle-distance runners
Athletes (track and field) at the 1990 Commonwealth Games
Athletes (track and field) at the 1984 Summer Olympics
Commonwealth Games bronze medallists for New Zealand
Olympic athletes of New Zealand
New Zealand emigrants to Australia
Commonwealth Games medallists in athletics
Medallists at the 1990 Commonwealth Games